Reading is a city in Lyon County, Kansas, United States.  As of the 2020 census, the population of the city was 181.

History

For millennia, the land that is currently Kansas was inhabited by Native Americans.  In 1803, the United States secured most of modern Kansas as part of the Louisiana Purchase.  In 1854, Congress organized the Kansas Territory and in 1861, Kansas became the 34th state.

In 1863, by Act of Congress and similarly by an act of the State of Kansas, the Atchison, Topeka and Santa Fe Railway was granted 3,000,000 acres of Kansas land on the condition that it would build a continuous line to the western border of Kansas by March 1, 1873. On Oct. 30, 1868, construction began at Topeka. By Sept. 14, 1870, the first Santa Fe train reached Emporia, fifteen miles past the present site of Reading. James Fagan, agent for the railroad lands, and T. J. Peter and M. S. Sargent, who represented the railroad interest, organized a town company, with James Fagan as president. The land was owned by McMann & Co., of Reading, Pennsylvania.  The town was platted on sixty acres of Section 3, Township 18, Range 13, and called it Reading, after Reading, Pennsylvania.  In summer 1870, the town site was surveyed.

The first post office in Reading was established in August 1870.  Reading was incorporated as a city in September 1890.

2011 tornado

On May 21, 2011 around 9:15PM, an EF3 tornado hit Reading. It was three blocks wide and stayed on the ground for about four miles.  The tornado destroyed at least 56 of 110 homes and 14 of 21 businesses. The post office and fire station suffered major damage. One person died and two were hospitalized. Early damage estimates topped $2.2 million.

In just over a year, the community rebuilt itself with some help of the Federal Emergency Management Agency. The grain elevator destroyed in the tornado has been rebuilt, houses have been repaired, destroyed trees removed, and once again Reading has become a quiet place to live.

Geography
Reading is located at  (38.519102, -95.959091) at the eastern edge of Lyon County. It is fifteen miles northeast of Emporia and fourteen miles southwest of Osage City along Highway 170.

Climate
The climate in this area is characterized by hot, humid summers and generally mild to cool winters.  According to the Köppen Climate Classification system, Reading has a humid subtropical climate, abbreviated "Cfa" on climate maps.

Demographics

Reading is part of the Emporia Micropolitan Statistical Area.

2010 census
As of the census of 2010, there were 231 people, 86 households, and 62 families residing in the city. The racial makeup of the city was 100.0% White. Hispanic or Latino of any race were 3.9% of the population.

There were 86 households, of which 46.5% had children under the age of 18 living with them, 52.3% were married couples living together, 12.8% had a female householder with no husband present, 7.0% had a male householder with no wife present, and 27.9% were non-families. 24.4% of all households were made up of individuals, and 8.2% had someone living alone who was 65 years of age or older. The average household size was 2.69 and the average family size was 3.15.

The median age in the city was 32.9 years. 33.8% of residents were under the age of 18; 5.1% were between the ages of 18 and 24; 27.2% were from 25 to 44; 26.4% were from 45 to 64; and 7.4% were 65 years of age or older. The gender makeup of the city was 53.7% male and 46.3% female.

2000 census
As of the census of 2000, there were 247 people, 92 households, and 63 families residing in the city. The racial makeup of the city was 97.98% White, 0.40% African American, and 1.62% from two or more races. Hispanic or Latino of any race were 1.62% of the population.

There were 92 households, out of which 39.1% had children under the age of 18 living with them, 53.3% were married couples living together, 7.6% had a female householder with no husband present, and 31.5% were non-families. 26.1% of all households were made up of individuals, and 9.8% had someone living alone who was 65 years of age or older. The average household size was 2.68 and the average family size was 3.29.

In the city, the population was spread out, with 33.2% under the age of 18, 6.5% from 18 to 24, 34.4% from 25 to 44, 16.6% from 45 to 64, and 9.3% who were 65 years of age or older. The median age was 32 years. For every 100 females, there were 96.0 males. For every 100 females age 18 and over, there were 108.9 males.

The median income for a household in the city was $25,000, and the median income for a family was $29,500. Males had a median income of $18,750 versus $25,536 for females. The per capita income for the city was $11,673. About 15.6% of families and 13.3% of the population were below the poverty line, including 14.4% of those under the age of eighteen and none of those 65 or over.

Government
The Reading government consists of a mayor and five council members.  The council meets the first Thursday of each month at 7PM.
 City Hall, 413 First Street.
 U.S. Post Office, 404 First Street.
 Kansas Department of Wildlife & Park, 2272 Road 250.

Education
The community is served by North Lyon County USD 251 public school district.

The city previously had a school located at 424 First Street.  Reading High School was closed through school unification in 1980. The Reading High School mascot was "The Reading Lions". The Reading Elementary School closed at the end of the 2017-2018 academic year. Students previously attending Reading generally attend the USD 251 school in Americus. High school students attend Northern Heights High School located near Allen. The Northern Heights High School mascot is Wildcats.  As of March 21, 2019 the school district had not made a decision as to the disposition of the school building in Reading

Notable people
 Jim Barnett, unsuccessful 2006 Republican candidate for governor of Kansas, grew up on a farm near Reading and graduated from Reading High School.
 Robert D. "Bob" Price (1927–2004), U.S. Representative from the Texas Panhandle from 1967 to 1975, was born in Reading.

See also
 Tornado outbreak sequence of May 21–26, 2011

References

Further reading

External links

City
 City of Reading
 Reading - Directory of Public Officials
Historical
 Reading - Early history
 May 2011 Tornado
 Photos of tornado recovery, kansastravel.org
 Kansas officials inspect damage in Reading, The Topeka Capital-Journal
 45 photos of Reading tornado damage, The Kansas City Star
 50 photos of Reading tornado damage, The Wichita Eagle
 Numerous photos of Reading tornado damage, Flickr
 Video of Reading tornado seen from a TV tower, KSN
Maps
 Reading city map, KDOT

Cities in Kansas
Cities in Lyon County, Kansas
Emporia, Kansas micropolitan area
Populated places established in 1870
1870 establishments in Kansas